A vertical take-off and landing (VTOL) aircraft is one that can take off and land vertically without relying on a runway. This classification can include a variety of types of aircraft including helicopters as well as thrust-vectoring fixed-wing aircraft and other hybrid aircraft with powered rotors such as cyclogyros/cyclocopters and gyrodynes.

Some VTOL aircraft can operate in other modes as well, such as CTOL (conventional take-off & landing), STOL (short take-off & landing), or STOVL (short take-off & vertical landing). Others, such as some helicopters, can only operate as VTOL, due to the aircraft lacking landing gear that can handle taxiing. VTOL is a subset of V/STOL (vertical or short take-off & landing).

Some lighter-than-air aircraft also qualify as VTOL aircraft, as they can hover, takeoff and land with vertical approach/departure profiles.

Electric vertical takeoff and landing aircraft, or eVTOLs, are being developed along with more autonomous flight control technologies and mobility-as-a-service (MaaS) to enable advanced air mobility (AAM), that could include on-demand air taxi services, regional air mobility, freight delivery, and personal air vehicles (PAVs).

Besides the ubiquitous helicopters, there are currently two types of VTOL aircraft in military service: tiltrotor aircraft, such as the Bell Boeing V-22 Osprey, and thrust-vectoring airplanes, such as the Harrier family and new F-35B Lightning II Joint Strike Fighter (JSF). In the civilian sector currently only helicopters are in general use (some other types of commercial VTOL aircraft have been proposed and are under development ). Generally speaking, VTOL aircraft capable of STOVL use it wherever possible, since it typically significantly increases takeoff weight, range or payload compared to pure VTOL.

History

Props, proprotors and advanced rotorcraft

The idea of vertical flight has been around for thousands of years, and sketches for a VTOL (helicopter) show up in Leonardo da Vinci's sketch book. Manned VTOL aircraft, in the form of primitive helicopters, first flew in 1907 but would take until after World War Two to perfect.

In addition to helicopter development, many approaches have been tried to develop practical aircraft with vertical take-off and landing capabilities including Henry Berliner's 1922–1925 experimental horizontal rotor fixed wing aircraft, and Nikola Tesla's 1928 patent and George Lehberger's 1930 patent for relatively impractical VTOL fixed wing airplanes with a tilting engines. In the late 1930s British aircraft designer Leslie Everett Baynes was issued a patent for the Baynes Heliplane, another tilt rotor aircraft. In 1941 German designer Heinrich Focke's began work on the Focke-Achgelis Fa 269, which had two rotors that tilted downward for vertical takeoff, but wartime bombing halted development.

In May 1951, both Lockheed and Convair were awarded contracts in the attempt to design, construct, and test two experimental VTOL fighters. Lockheed produced the XFV, and Convair producing the Convair XFY Pogo. Both experimental programs proceeded to flight status and completed test flights 1954–1955, when the contracts were cancelled. Similarly, the Ryan X-13 Vertijet flew a series of test flights between 1955 and 1957, but also suffered the same fate.

The use of vertical fans driven by engines was investigated in the 1950s. The US built an aircraft where the jet exhaust drove the fans, while British projects not built included fans driven by mechanical drives from the jet engines.

NASA has flown other VTOL craft such as the Bell XV-15 research craft (1977), as have the Soviet Navy and Luftwaffe. Sikorsky tested an aircraft dubbed the X-Wing, which took off in the manner of a helicopter. The rotors would become stationary in mid-flight, and function as wings, providing lift in addition to the static wings. Boeing X-50 is a Canard Rotor/Wing prototype that utilizes a similar concept.

A different British VTOL project was the gyrodyne, where a rotor is powered during take-off and landing but which then freewheels during flight, with separate propulsion engines providing forward thrust. Starting with the Fairey Gyrodyne, this type of aircraft later evolved into the much larger twin-engined Fairey Rotodyne, that used tipjets to power the rotor on take-off and landing but which then used two Napier Eland turboprops driving conventional propellers mounted on substantial wings to provide propulsion, the wings serving to unload the rotor during horizontal flight. The Rotodyne was developed to combine the efficiency of a fixed-wing aircraft at cruise with the VTOL capability of a helicopter to provide short haul airliner service from city centres to airports.

The CL-84 Dynavert was a Canadian V/STOL turbine tilt-wing monoplane designed and manufactured by Canadair between 1964 and 1972. The Canadian government ordered three updated CL-84s for military evaluation in 1968, designated the CL-84-1. From 1972 to 1974, this version was demonstrated and evaluated in the United States aboard the aircraft carriers USS Guam and USS Guadalcanal, and at various other centres. These trials involved military pilots from the United States, the United Kingdom and Canada. During testing, two of the CL-84s crashed due to mechanical failures, but no loss of life occurred as a result of these accidents. No production contracts resulted.

Although tiltrotors such as the Focke-Achgelis Fa 269 of the mid-1940s and the Centro Técnico Aeroespacial "Convertiplano" of the 1950s reached testing or mock-up stages, the Bell-Boeing V-22 Osprey is considered the world's first production tiltrotor aircraft. It has one three-bladed proprotor, turboprop engine, and transmission nacelle mounted on each wingtip. The Osprey is a multi-mission aircraft with both a vertical takeoff and landing (VTOL) and short takeoff and landing capability (STOL). It is designed to perform missions like a conventional helicopter with the long-range, high-speed cruise performance of a turboprop aircraft. The FAA classifies the Osprey as a model of powered lift aircraft.

Attempts were made in the 1960s to develop a commercial passenger aircraft with VTOL capability. The Hawker Siddeley Inter-City Vertical-Lift proposal had two rows of lifting fans on either side. However, none of these aircraft made it to production after they were dismissed as too heavy and expensive to operate.

In 2018 Opener Aero demonstrated an electrically powered fixed-wing VTOL aircraft, the Blackfly, which the manufacturer claims is the world's first ultralight fixed-wing, all-electric, vertical take-off and landing aircraft.

Modern drones

In the 21st century, unmanned drones are becoming increasingly commonplace. Many of these have VTOL capability, especially the quadcopter type.

Jet lift

Tail-sitters

In 1947, Ryan X-13 Vertijet, a tailsitter design, was ordered by the US Navy, who then further issued a proposal in 1948 for an aircraft capable of vertical takeoff and landing (VTOL) aboard platforms mounted on the afterdecks of conventional ships. Both Convair and Lockheed competed for the contract but in 1950, the requirement was revised, with a call for a research aircraft capable of eventually evolving into a VTOL ship-based convoy escort fighter.

Conventional design

Another more influential early functional contribution to VTOL was Rolls-Royce's Thrust Measuring Rig ("flying bedstead") of 1953. This led to the first VTOL engines as used in the first British VTOL aircraft, the Short SC.1 (1957), Short Brothers and Harland, Belfast which used four vertical lift engines with a horizontal one for forward thrust.

The Short SC.1 was the first British fixed-wing VTOL aircraft. The SC.1 was designed to study the problems with VTOL flight and the transition to and from forward flight. The SC.1 was designed to meet a Ministry of Supply (MoS) request for tender (ER.143T) for a vertical take-off research aircraft issued in September 1953. The design was accepted by the ministry and a contract was placed for two aircraft (XG900 and XG905) to meet Specification ER.143D dated 15 October 1954. The SC.1 was also equipped with the first "fly-by-wire" control system for a VTOL aircraft. This permitted three modes of control of the aerodynamic surfaces or the nozzle controls.

The Republic Aviation AP-100 was a prototype VTOL 6x General Electric J85 Turbojet engined nuclear capable strike fighter concept designed by Alexander Kartveli that had 3x ducted fans in the centre of its fuselage and tail as a possible contender for the TFX Program. Another design was the A400 AVS that used variable geometry wings but was found too complicated, however it led to the development of the AFVG which in turn helped the development of the Panavia Tornado.

The Yakovlev Yak-38 was a Soviet Navy VTOL aircraft intended for use aboard their light carriers, cargoships, and capital ships. It was developed from the Yakovlev Yak-36 experimental aircraft in the 1970s. Before the Soviet Union broke up, a supersonic VTOL aircraft was developed as the Yak-38's successor, the Yak-141, which never went into production.

In the 1960s and early 1970s, Germany planned three different VTOL aircraft. One used the Lockheed F-104 Starfighter as a basis for research for a V/STOL aircraft. Although two models (X1 and X2) were built, the project was canceled due to high costs and political problems as well as changed needs in the German Air Force and NATO. The EWR VJ 101C did perform free VTOL take-offs and landings, as well as test flights beyond mach 1 in the mid- and late 60s. One of the test-aircraft is preserved in the Deutsches Museum in Munich, Germany, another outside Friedrichshafen Airport. The others were the VFW-Fokker VAK 191B light fighter and reconnaissance aircraft, and the Dornier Do 31E-3 (troop) transport.

The LLRV was a spacecraft simulator for the Apollo lunar lander. It was designed to mimic the flight characteristics of the lunar module (LEM), which had to rely on a reaction engine to land on the Moon.

The idea of using the same engine for vertical and horizontal flight by altering the path of the thrust was conceived by Michel Wibault. It led to the Bristol Siddeley Pegasus engine which used four rotating nozzles to direct thrust over a range of angles. This was developed side by side with an airframe, the Hawker P.1127, which became subsequently the Kestrel and then entered production as the Hawker Siddeley Harrier, though the supersonic Hawker Siddeley P.1154 was canceled in 1965. The French in competition with the P.1154 had developed a version of the Dassault Mirage III capable of attaining Mach 1. The Dassault Mirage IIIV achieved transition from vertical to horizontal flight in March 1966, reaching Mach 1.3 in level flight a short time later.

V/STOL

The Harrier is usually flown in STOVL mode, which enables it to carry a higher fuel or weapon load over a given distance. In V/STOL the VTOL aircraft moves horizontally along the runway before taking off using vertical thrust. This gives aerodynamic lift as well as thrust lift and permits taking off with heavier loads and is more efficient. When landing the aircraft is much lighter due to the loss of propellant weight and a controlled vertical landing is possible. An important aspect of Harrier STOL operations aboard naval carriers is the "ski jump" raised forward deck, which gives the craft additional vertical momentum at takeoff.

The March 1981 cover of Popular Science showed three illustrations for its "Tilt-engine V/STOL - speeds like a plane, lands like a copter" front-page feature story.; a followup story was part of the April 2006 issue that mentioned "the fuel-consumption and stability problems that plagued earlier plane/copter."

Retired from the British Royal Navy in 2006, the Indian Navy continued to operate Sea Harriers until 2016, mainly from its aircraft carrier . The latest version of the Harrier, the BAE Harrier II, was retired in December 2010 after being operated by the British Royal Air Force and Royal Navy. The United States Marine Corps and the Italian and Spanish navies all continue to use the AV-8B Harrier II, an American-designed equivalent version. Replacing the Harrier II/AV-8B in the air arms of the US and UK is the STOVL variant of the Lockheed Martin F-35 Lightning II, the F-35B.

Rockets

SpaceX developed several prototypes of Falcon 9 to validate various low-altitude, low-velocity engineering aspects of its reusable launch system development program. The first prototype, Grasshopper, made eight successful test flights in 2012–2013. It made its eighth, and final, test flight on October 7, 2013, flying to an altitude of  before making its eighth successful VTVL landing.<ref name=sx20131012fb>{{cite web |url=https://www.facebook.com/SpaceX/posts/10153372146765131 |title= Grasshopper flies to its highest height to date |publisher=SpaceX |work=Social media information release |date=12 October 2013 |access-date=14 October 2013 |quote=WATCH: Grasshopper flies to its highest height to date – 744 m (2441 ft) into the Texas sky.}}</ref> This was the last scheduled test for the Grasshopper rig; next up will be low altitude tests of the Falcon 9 Reusable (F9R) development vehicle in Texas followed by high altitude testing in New Mexico.

On November 23, 2015, Blue Origin's New Shepard booster rocket made the first successful vertical landing following an uncrewed suborbital test flight that reached space. On December 21, 2015, SpaceX Falcon 9 first stage made a successful landing after boosting 11 commercial satellites to low Earth orbit on Falcon 9 Flight 20. These demonstrations opened the way for substantial reductions in space flight costs.

Rotorcraft

Helicopter

The helicopter's form of VTOL allows it to take off and land vertically, to hover, and to fly forwards, backwards, and laterally. These attributes allow helicopters to be used in congested or isolated areas where fixed-wing aircraft would usually not be able to take off or land. The capability to efficiently hover for extended periods of time is due to the helicopter's relatively long, and hence efficient rotor blades, and allows a helicopter to accomplish tasks that fixed-wing aircraft and other forms of vertical takeoff and landing aircraft could not perform at least as well until 2011.

On the other hand, the long rotor blades restrict the maximum speed to about 250 miles per hour (400 km/h) of at least conventional helicopters, as retreating blade stall causes lateral instability.

Autogyro

Autogyros are also known as gyroplanes or gyrocopters. The rotor is unpowered and rotates freely in the airflow as the craft travels forward, so the craft needs a conventional powerplant to provide thrust. An autogyro is not intrinsically capable of VTOL: for VTO the rotor must be spun up to speed by an auxiliary drive, and vertical landing requires precise control of rotor momentum and pitch.

Gyrodyne

Gyrodynes are also known as compound helicopters or compound gyroplanes. A gyrodyne has the powered rotor of a helicopter with a separate forward thrust system of an autogyro. Apart from take-off and landing the rotor may be unpowered and autorotate. Designs may also include stub wings for added lift.

Cyclogyro

A cyclogyro or cyclocopter has a rotary wing whose axis and surfaces remain sideways across the airflow, as with a conventional wing.

Powered lift

Convertiplane

A convertiplane takes off under rotor lift like a helicopter, then transitions to fixed-wing lift in forward flight.

Tiltrotor

A tiltrotor or proprotor tilts its propellers or rotors vertically for VTOL and then tilts them forwards for horizontal wing-borne flight, while the main wing remains fixed in place.

Tilting ducted fan
Similar to tiltrotor concept, but with ducted fans. As it can be seen in the Bell X-22.

Tiltwing

A tiltwing has its propellers or rotors fixed to a conventional wing and tilts the whole assembly to transition between vertical and horizontal flight.

Tail-sitter

A tail-sitter sits vertically on its tail for takeoff and landing, then tilts the whole aircraft forward for horizontal flight.

Vectored thrust

Thrust vectoring is a technique used for jet and rocket engines, where the direction of the engine exhaust is varied. In VTOL, the exhaust can be varied between vertical and horizontal thrust.

Tiltjet

Similar to tiltrotor concept, but with turbojet or turbofan engines instead of ones with propellers.

Lift jets

A lift jet is an auxiliary jet engine used to provide lift for VTOL operation, but may be shut down for normal wing-borne flight. The Yak-38 is the only production aircraft to employ lift jets.

Lift fans

Lift fan is an aircraft configuration in which lifting fans are located in large holes in an otherwise conventional fixed wing or fuselage. It is used for V/STOL operation.

The aircraft takes off using the fans to provide lift, then transitions to fixed-wing lift in forward flight. Several experimental craft have been flown, but only the F-35 Lightning II entered into production.

Lift via Coandă effect

Aircraft in which VTOL is achieved by exploiting the Coandă effect are capable of redirecting air much like thrust vectoring, but rather than routing airflow through a duct, the airflow is simply routed along an existing surface, which is usually the body of the craft allowing less material and weight.

The Avro Canada VZ-9 Avrocar, or simply the VZ-9, was a Canadian VTOL aircraft developed by Avro Aircraft Ltd. which utilizes this phenomenon by blowing air into a central area, then it is directed down over the top surface, which is parabolic and resembles a bowed flying saucer. Due to the Coandă effect, the airflow is attracted to the nearest surface and continues to move along that surface despite the change in the surface's direction away from the airflow. The craft is designed to direct the airflow downward to provide lift.

Jetoptera announced a proposed line of aircraft based on what it called fluidic propulsion that employs the Coandă effect. The company claims an Oswald efficiency number of 1.45 for its boxwing design. Other claims include increased efficiency, 30% lower weight, reduced complexity, as much as 25 dBA lower (and atonal) noise, shorter wings, and scalability. Jetoptera says its approach yields 10% more thrust and uses 50% less fuel than a small turbojet.

Gallery

See also

 Circular wing
 List of Nikola Tesla patents
 List of VTOL aircraft
 McDonnell Douglas DC-X
 Mono tiltrotor
 Peter Bielkowicz
 Proprotor
 PTOL
 Quad (rocket)
 Reusable Vehicle Testing project of the Japanese Space Agency JAXA
 Rotor wing
 Thrust reversal
 Thrust vectoring
 Vertical Flight Society

References

Notes

Bibliography

 Allen, Francis J. "Bolt upright: Convair's and Lockheed's VTOL fighters". Air Enthusiast (Key Publishing), Volume 127, January/February 2007. .
 Boniface, Patrick. "Tilt-wing Testing". Aeroplane, Vol. 28, no. 3, March 2000, pp. 72–78.
 Campbell, John P. Vertical Takeoff & Landing Aircraft. New York: The MacMillan Company, 1962.
 Harding, Stephen. "Flying Jeeps: The US Army's Search for the Ultimate 'Vehicle'". Air Enthusiast, No. 73, January/February 1998, pp. 10–12. Stamford, Lincs, UK: Key Publishing. .
 Jackson, Paul A. German Military Aviation 1956–1976. Hinckley, Leicestershire, UK: Midland Counties Publications, 1976. .
 Khurana, K. C. Aviation Management: Global Perspectives. Singapore: Global India Publications, 2009. .
 Markman, Steve and Bill Holder. Straight Up: A History of Vertical Flight. Atglen, Pennsylvania: Schiffer Publishing, 2000. .
 Norton, Bill. Bell Boeing V-22 Osprey, Tiltrotor Tactical Transport. Earl Shilton, Leicester, UK: Midland Publishing, 2004. .
 Rogers, Mike. VTOL: Military Research Aircraft. New York: Orion Books, 1989. .
 Büchi, Roland. Fascination Quadrocopter. Norderstedt, BoD, English Version, 2011.

External links

 V/STOL Wheel of Misfortune  – Timeline of V/STOL aircraft, page 5
 

 
Types of take-off and landing
Articles containing video clips